Wagon Wheel is a census-designated place in Navajo County, in the U.S. state of Arizona. The population was 1,652 at the 2010 census.

Demographics

As of the census of 2010, there were 1,652 people, 680 households, and 434 families living in the CDP.

References

Census-designated places in Navajo County, Arizona